Used People is a 1992 romantic comedy film directed by Beeban Kidron. The film stars Shirley MacLaine, Marcello Mastroianni, Bob Dishy, Kathy Bates, Marcia Gay Harden, Jessica Tandy, Doris Roberts and Joe Pantoliano. The screenplay by Todd Graff, adapted from his 1988 off-Broadway play The Grandma Plays, takes a humorous look at a highly dysfunctional family living in the New York City borough of Queens circa 1969.  It is an international co-production between Japan and the United States.

Plot summary
In the 1960s, Pearl Berman has just returned home from her husband Jack's funeral, her grief disrupted by her many relatives animatedly discussing which parkway offered the best route to the cemetery. Pearl's family tackles any and every subject – from body odor to toilets to Tupperware to borscht – as if it is worthy of a major debate.

Into a household filled with kvetchers steps Joe Meledandri, a distinguished Italian who years ago met Pearl's wayward husband in a bar, and convinced him to return to her. He has desired her ever since, and now that Pearl is a widow, Joe feels the time is right to make his move. He invites her for coffee, his first step on the road to seduction.

What remains to be seen is if he can overcome family objections to religious differences and if he is willing to accept Pearl's daughters: the lonely, overweight Bibby and the pretty but psychologically unstable Norma, who dresses up as celebrities to escape the grief that has overwhelmed her since the death of one of her children and divorce from her husband.  At her father's funeral, Norma dresses up the way Jackie Kennedy appeared at the funeral of her husband; appears as Marilyn Monroe as she serves her surviving son his breakfast; and also impersonates Faye Dunaway and Barbra Streisand, among others, and those are just some of the crazy relatives who come as part of the package.

Cast
Shirley MacLaine as Pearl Berman
Marcello Mastroianni as Joe Meledandri
Bob Dishy as Jack Berman
Kathy Bates as Bibby Berman
Marcia Gay Harden as Norma
Jessica Tandy as Freida
Sylvia Sidney as Becky
Lee Wallace as Uncle Harry
Doris Roberts as Aunt Lonnie
Joe Pantoliano as Frank
Louis Guss as Uncle Normy
Helen Hanft as Aunt Ruthie
Gil Filar as Mark

Principal production credits
Producer – Lawrence Gordon
Executive producers – Michael Barnathan, Lloyd Levin
Original music – Rachel Portman
Cinematography – David Watkin
Choreography – Patricia Birch
Production designer – Stuart Wurtzel
Art director – Gregory P. Keen
Costume design – Marilyn Vance

Reception
As of October 2019, Used People holds a rating of 44% on Rotten Tomatoes based on 16 reviews.

In her review in The New York Times, Janet Maslin observed, "As directed by Beeban Kidron, [the film] makes an international issue out of an Italian-Jewish courtship. It also slathers the ethnic equivalent of corn onto every sentimental scene."

Roger Ebert of the Chicago Sun-Times wrote, "The movie is by turns serious, satirical, bittersweet, maudlin, satirical, romantic, and farcical... MacLaine is a pro and survives the material... We care about her enough, indeed, to wonder if meeting the Mastroianni character is really the best thing that could have happened to her. He doesn't often seem like a real human in this movie; he's more like an all-purpose writer's device. The odds are against any sane person being able to behave like this man... what the movie could not overcome, for me at least, is the lack of any convincing romantic chemistry between [the two]."

Variety stated, "A modern, absurdist sensibility informs the soap opera Used People... which harks back to '50s weepies... MacLaine's precise acting is laudatory and balanced by a very sympathetic turn by twinkle-eyed Mastroianni, in his best English-language role by far. The support ensemble is excellent."

Rita Kempley of The Washington Post said, "Used People wants to be Moonstruck with matzo balls, but it's less an eccentric romantic comedy than an icky, three-layered Jewish mother joke... it's rich in character if rather trite in theme and scene."

In The New Yorker, Michael Sragow observed, "Life goes on – for the audience, seemingly forever — in yet another ethnic comedy-drama ... In the end, love conquers everything from religious differences to mental illness: everything, that is, except the forced eccentricity and bickering stereotypes in Todd Graff's script."

In his review of the videotape release, Ty Burr of Entertainment Weekly rated the film C- and added, "Everything's in italics in this Jewish Moonstruck... MacLaine honks nasally ... Mastroianni talks in spumoni aphorisms... the score oompahs with grating merriment as characters parade cutesy tics instead of human traits. With stars as gifted as Jessica Tandy, Sylvia Sidney, and Kathy Bates drowning in the tough-talking treacle, it's one of those movies that gives New York a worse name than it already has."

The film grossed $18 million in the United States and Canada, and $10 million overseas for a worldwide total of $28 million.

Accolades
Marcello Mastroianni was nominated for the Golden Globe Award for Best Actor – Motion Picture Musical or Comedy and Shirley MacLaine was nominated for the Golden Globe Award for Best Actress – Motion Picture Musical or Comedy. The Casting Society of America nominated Mary Colquhoun for the Artios Award for Best Casting for a Dramatic Feature Film.

Home video release
Despite being distributed by 20th Century Fox on its initial release in 1992, the film was put on DVD on March 22, 2011, by Warner Home Video as part of their Warner Archive Collection.

References

External links
 
 

1992 films
1992 romantic comedy films
American romantic comedy films
Films about dysfunctional families
Largo Entertainment films
American films based on plays
Films directed by Beeban Kidron
Films scored by Rachel Portman
Films set in New York City
Films set in 1969
1990s English-language films
1990s American films